Francois Ratier (born August 12, 1972) is a French rugby union and Canadian coach. He is the head coach of the Canada women's national rugby union team. He led them to their first Finals appearance at the 2014 Women's Rugby World Cup in his homeland. He took over the reins as head coach in March 2013.

In January 2016, he became an interim head coach for the Canadian national men's side during the 2016 Americas Rugby Championship, where he led the side to third in the tournament with victories over Uruguay, Chile and Brazil.

References

1972 births
Living people
French rugby union coaches
Canadian rugby union coaches
Sportspeople from Charente
French rugby union players